Italy competed at the 1994 European Athletics Championships in Helsinki, Finland, from 7 to 14 August 1994.

Medalists

See also
 Italy national athletics team

References

External links
 EAA official site 

 

Italy at the European Athletics Championships
Nations at the 1994 European Athletics Championships
1994 in Italian sport